Parapeytoia is a prehistoric arthropod that lived over 530 million years ago (Cambrian Stage 3) in the Maotianshan shales of prehistoric China.  It was interpreted as an anomalocaridid (radiodont) with legs, but later studies reveal it was a megacheiran, a group of arthropods which are no longer thought to be closely related to the radiodonts.

Parapeytoia is known from a few incomplete fossil materials with part of its ventral structures preserved. The frontmost appendages were a pair of great appendages that had a peduncle and 4 spines on each of them, a characteristic feature shared by other megacheirans such as Yohoia and Fortiforceps. Behind the great appendages were 2 or 3 pairs of short appendages, and numerous pairs of well-developed biramous appendages, each formed by a basipod with spiny gnathobase, lobe-like exopod and leg-like endopod with 8 segments. A narrow sternite associated between each of those appendages.

Some features originally interpreted as anomalocaridid-like are more or less questionable, such as radial sclerites interpreted as its mouthparts have since been assigned to another genus of animal, Omnidens.

Parapeytoia was in all likelihood a benthic feeder, spending most of its time on the ocean floor hunting (or possibly scavenging) for prey.

References 

 Dinocaridids: anomalous arthropods or arthropod-like worms? by Hou Xianguang & Jan Bergström 2006 arguing that this genus is a dinocaridid

External links 

 An Anomalocarid With Legs?

Megacheira
Cambrian arthropods
Maotianshan shales fossils
Prehistoric arthropod genera
Cambrian genus extinctions